"The '59 Sound" is the debut single by American rock band the Gaslight Anthem. Written by the band and produced by Ted Hutt, it is the title track of the band's second full-length album. The song reached the U.S. Hot Modern Rock Tracks chart in early 2009. The song, which received mostly favorable reviews from critics, was performed live by the band with Bruce Springsteen at the Glastonbury and Hard Rock Calling festivals in June 2009.

Background
"The '59 Sound" was the first song written by singer-songwriter-guitarist 
Brian Fallon for the band's 2008 album, also titled The '59 Sound. 
Fallon recalled, "I never wrote a song like that before. And I thought it was better than anything else I ever wrote. I showed it to the guys [in the band] and they thought it was awesome. Then the next one was "Great Expectations" and we definitely knew where we were going with [the album]." Fallon said the band had tried to emulate the sound of soul music from the late 1950s, because "back then it seemed like there was a genuine feeling of excitement going on that I don't think is necessarily happening right now. It seems like when you look back on that era a lot of it is embodied in that Memphis sound, so it's just a giant celebratory thing." 
Bassist Alex Levine noted that in addition to being inspired by soul music, he used to use a 1959 Fender Bassman. 
Lyrically, the song is an elegy for a friend who died while the band was elsewhere performing a gig.

Release and reception
Released as a physical single in July 2008, "The '59 Sound" was released to U.S. modern rock radio stations in September. 
The song entered the Billboard Alternative Songs chart in January 2009, peaked at number 35 in February, and spent 10 weeks on the chart. 
The song's music video, directed by Kevin James Custer, premiered in July 2008. An alternate version, also directed by Custer and featuring the band's full performance of the song, debuted the following June. 
Also that month, "The '59 Sound" was re-released in the UK as a physical single, backed with a live cover version of Pearl Jam's "State of Love and Trust", as well as a live performance of "We Came to Dance", a song from the Gaslight Anthem's first album, Sink or Swim. The single reached number 115 on the UK Singles Chart in July.

"The '59 Sound" was generally well received by music critics, with Pitchfork Media writer Tom Breihan praising the bridge: "It's simple, it's sincere, and it kills me every time." 
CMJ New Music writer Tyler Theofilos said the song is "all about the exhilaration that goes along with raw, driving rock." 
Jason MacNeil of PopMatters compared it to the Killers and Tim-era Replacements. 
The song was ranked number 62 on Rolling Stone'''s list of "The 100 Best Singles of 2008".

Live
The Gaslight Anthem performed "The '59 Sound" live on the talk shows Late Night with Conan O'Brien 
and Late Show with David Letterman''. 
The band was joined onstage by Bruce Springsteen during performances of the song at Glastonbury Festival 2009 
and Hard Rock Calling 2009. 
Of Springsteen's Glastonbury appearance with the band, Brian Fallon recalled, "He just showed up. That was it. Nobody knew about it, nobody said anything, and he showed up an went, 'Can I play with you,' and we were, like, 'Absolutely. Yeah. All right.' It was literally three minutes before we went onstage."
In June 2011, band dedicated the song to the memory of Clarence Clemons during their set at the 2011 Glastonbury Festival. Clemons, a founding member of the E Street Band had died that same month due to a stroke.

Track listing

Charts

References

External links
Watch "The '59 Sound" video on YouTube
Watch the alternate version of "The '59 Sound" video on YouTube

2008 songs
2008 debut singles
2009 singles
The Gaslight Anthem songs